Kyrgyz registration plates were first issued in 1980, when the country was still a republic of the Soviet Union. Despite having gained its independence in 1991, it continued to use the old Soviet plates until the introduction of the current format in 1994.

Formats

1980-1993
Between 1980 and 1993, Kyrgyz plates were manufactured to the Soviet GOST 3207-77 standard. The characters were of the following format: x ## ## XX where x is a lowercase Cyrillic counter letter; # is any digit between 0 and 9; and XX are two uppercase Cyrillic letters indicating where the vehicle was registered (e.g. БИ for Bishkek).

1994

1994 saw the launch of another format, which resembles more closely the style of registration plates used in Europe. The most notable changes are the switch from Cyrillic letters to Latin, and the presence of the Kyrgyz flag in a narrow band to the left of the plate. The alphanumerics are rendered in DIN 1451. The plate format is: X 9999 XX while first letter is based on geographic location.

2015
Starting from July 2015, a new system has entered into circulation. Each province now has a two digit code. The new license plates have the font FE-Schrift. The numbers usually have a font size slightly larger than the letters, similar to Russian vehicle registration plates.

Private vehicles
The license plates have the format ##  - ### xxx, where the first two digits are province codes. The plate is black on white. Right under the province codes, there is the Kyrgyz flag and the code KG.

Motorcycles
The license plates have the format ##  - ### xx, where the first two digits are province codes. The plate is black on white.

Governmental vehicles
The license plates have the format ## - ### PT, where the first two digits are province codes. The plate is black on white.

President

Foreign
The following plates are black on yellow. These flags show the code KG, but not the Kyrgyz flag. These plates have the following format: ## - #### L, where the first two digits are the province codes. The letter would be either of the following:
 H: For a vehicle owned by a foreign citizen.
 P: For a vehicles who would be in the country for more than 6 months
 M: For foreign firms, their staff and families.
 K: Belonging to foreign media

Diplomatic
Diplomatic license plates are white on red, whereas the license plates for UN vehicles are white on blue. The license plates have the format L ## ###. The letter could be any of the following:
 C: Official and personal vehicles of heads of consular posts and staff, i.e. Corps consulaires
 D: Vehicles of diplomatic and other international organizations, as well as personal vehicles chapters (new format) and employees of the diplomatic rank of the offices, organizations, missions and members of their families, i.e. Corps diplomatiques
 T: Vehicles of administrative and technical staff of diplomatic and consular missions, other international organizations and the family members of these employees.

The two digit number would be the country or organization code. The following table shows the codes:

The three digit number is assigned in increasing order. Numbers 001 to 099 are assigned to diplomatic missions, and numbers 100 to 999 to private cars of the diplomats.
On the right end, the date of the issuance of the plate is posted, with the month on the top, and the year on the bottom.

Honorary Consulate plates are white on red, and have the format HC ####, where the four digit number is the country code. On the 
right end, the date of the issuance of the plate is posted, with the month on the top, and the year on the bottom.

There's also a license plate format for official and personal vehicles of heads of diplomatic missions.

Region identifiers

Current
Starting from July 2016, a two digit code has been assigned to each region, similar to the format in Russia. There is a potential to add more codes to each region, as each of the existing codes get used up.

1994-2016

1980-1994

References 

Kyrgyzstan
Transport in Kyrgyzstan